Simo Choukoud (born 1 January 1999 in the Netherlands) is a Dutch footballer who last played for Pafos in Cyprus.

Career

Choukoud started his senior career with Feyenoord. In 2018, he signed for Pafos in the Cypriot First Division, where he made two appearances and scored zero goals.

References

External links
 'I never thought: if I become a pro, it has to be at Feyenoord'
 Ramadan Special: Simo Choukoud 
 Interview Mohamed Choukoud

Living people
Dutch footballers
1999 births
Feyenoord players
Pafos FC players
Association football midfielders